Saxby is a locality in the Shire of Richmond, Queensland, Australia.

Road infrastructure
The Richmond–Croydon Road runs along part of the south-eastern boundary and then crosses the north-eastern corner.

References 

Shire of Richmond
Localities in Queensland